Eight Letters or 8 Letters may refer to:

 8 Letters, album by Why Don't We
 "8 Letters", song from the above album
 "Eight Letters", song by Take That from the album Progress